The Regio-Tour is a multi-stage road bicycle race held between France, Switzerland and Germany. It was first held in 1985 and since 2005 it has been organised as a 2.1 event on the UCI Europe Tour. Famous riders like Laurent Brochard, Jan Ullrich, Alexander Vinokourov, Andreas Klöden, Mario Cipollini and Viatcheslav Ekimov have won the race.

Since 2002 it is called Rothaus Regio-Tour due to sponsorship.

There was no professional edition since 2008 and the tour was since then just held a junior race.

Winners

External links 
Official Website 

UCI Europe Tour races
Cycle races in Germany
Cycle races in France
Cycle races in Switzerland
Recurring sporting events established in 1985
1985 establishments in France
1985 establishments in Germany
1985 establishments in Switzerland
Summer events in Switzerland